Jack J. Gross (born July 29, 1902 in New York City, died March 12, 1964, age 61, London, England) was a motion picture and television producer.

Early years
Jack Gross was the son of George and Pauline Gross, Jewish immigrants from Hungary and Romania, respectively. The oldest of three brothers, Jack Gross began working as an usher after school in New York City, as a projectionist in St. Joseph, Missouri, and as a theater manager in South Bend, Indiana, Eldorado, Kansas, Minneapolis, San Francisco, and Los Angeles, before being appointed western division manager of RKO Theaters.

Producer
In 1939, Gross became a producer at Universal Pictures, remaining there until 1943, when he was appointed executive producer at RKO. Gross joined Philip N. Krasne in 1952 to form Gross-Krasne, Inc, a pioneer American independent producer of television films. They produced, among other programs, the Big Town and Mayor of the Town. Gross-Krasne also acquired the rights to O. Henry's stories and filmed 39 half-hour O. Henry Playhouse  television shows. In 1952, Gross-Krasne bought the California Studios (now the Raleigh Studios) where many of their productions were filmed.

Death
In the Connaught Hotel, Gross died suddenly of basilar cerebral thrombosis while on a business trip to London. His remains were cremated and dispersed in the Garden of Rest Cemetery, London.

Selected filmography
 Return of the Bad Men (1948)

References

1902 births
1964 deaths
American film studio executives
American film producers
American people of Romanian-Jewish descent
Film producers from California
Television producers from California
20th-century American businesspeople